The Games of Countess Dolingen is a 1981 French fantasy-drama film  written and directed by Catherine Binet and starring Carol Kane.

The film was entered into the main competition at the 38th edition of the Venice Film Festival.

Plot

Cast 
  
 Carol Kane  as Louise Haines-Pearson
 Michael Lonsdale as Bertrand Haines-Pearson
 Marina Vlady as the   mother of the little girl
 Marilú Marini  as Countess  Dolingen de Gratz / the maid
 Robert Stephens as the professor
  Roberto Plate as the traveler / the thief / the stranger
  Katia Wastchenko   as the little girl
 Emmanuelle Riva as a guest

Production
Katia Wastchenko remembers the making of the film as "an enjoyable experience", and describes Binet and the rest of the crew as "very kind". Although she had not read 'Sombre Printemps' and was, at the age of 12, "too young to be curious or interested about Unica Zürn's life", Wastchenko said that Binet "took the time to explain to her the context of the most 'sensual' scenes", and helped her to approach the role by confiding some of her own childhood memories.

References

External links

 
 

French fantasy drama films
1980s fantasy drama films
1981 drama films
1981 films
1980s French-language films
1980s French films